Precourt is a surname. Notable people with the surname include:

Anthony Precourt (born  1969–70), American sports team owner
Charles J. Precourt (born 1955), American astronaut
Steve Precourt (born 1960), American politician